Vendémian is a commune in the Hérault department in the Occitanie region in southern France.

It is located on the D131 route, between Montpellier and Beziers.

Population

See also
Communes of the Hérault department

References

Communes of Hérault